"Dazed & Confused" is a song recorded by Australian singer-songwriter Ruel and produced by M-Phazes. The song was released on 27 October 2018 as the second single from Ruel's debut extended play, Ready (2018).

At the ARIA Music Awards of 2018, "Dazed & Confused" won the ARIA Award for Breakthrough Artist.

Background
Upon release, Ruel said: "I wrote "Dazed & Confused" in the front room of my Airbnb in Los Angeles last November and the song has come so far with the help of my good friend and collaborator M-Phazes, who also produced my upcoming EP. The song started with some simple, light-hearted piano chords and has since become the toughest track on the EP."

Music video
The music video was directed by Grey Ghost and released on 30 May 2018.

Reception
Broadway World draw comparisons to Justin Bieber's Purpose "most mature and earworm-ready hits", adding that the song "stands apart by drawing on blues and R&B for added depth."

Track listing
One-track single 
 "Dazed & Confused" – 3:09

One-track single 
 "Dazed & Confused" (Acoustic Version featuring Ezinma) – 3:57

RSD2021 Limited Edition 7" Transparent Green Vinyl (150 copies) 
 "Dazed & Confused" - 3:09
 "Dazed & Confused" (Instrumental Version) - 3:09

Charts

Certifications

Release history

References
 

2018 singles
2018 songs
Ruel (singer) songs
RCA Records singles
ARIA Award-winning songs
Songs written by M-Phazes
Songs written by Sean Douglas (songwriter)
Songs written by Ruel (singer)